Left in the Dark is the second EP by Finnish rock and metal soprano vocalist Tarja Turunen. The record features different versions from songs included in the chart topping album Colours in the Dark, plus a studio version of "Into the Sun", previously only available as a live track (originally on Act I). There was also a competition with grand prizes for the 5 best artworks.

Track listing

References

External links
Tarja Official Website
Official Album Website

2014 EPs
Symphonic metal EPs
Crossover (music)
Alternative rock albums by Finnish artists